The South African Railways Class 6J 4-6-0 of 1902 was a steam locomotive from the pre-Union era in the Cape of Good Hope.

In 1902, fourteen 6th Class bar framed steam locomotives with a 4-6-0 wheel arrangement were placed in service by the Cape Government Railways. In 1912, when they were assimilated into the South African Railways, they were renumbered and designated Class 6J.

Manufacturer
The original 6th Class locomotive had been designed at the Salt River works of the Cape Government Railways (CGR) in 1892 by H.M. Beatty, at the time the Cape Government Railways (Western System) Locomotive Superintendent.

The fourteen 6th Class locomotives which were placed in service by the CGR in 1902 were built by Neilson, Reid and Company.

Characteristics

The locomotives were practically identical to the two bar-framed locomotives which had been built by Sharp, Stewart and Company in 1900 and which became the South African Railways (SAR) Class 6F in 1912. They were visually identifiable as second-generation bar-framed 6th Class locomotives by their running boards, which were mounted above the coupled wheels without the need for wheel fairings.

As built, the smokebox was equipped with openings on its sides, near the front, with covers which each had a handle by which it could be opened with a half turn to give direct access to the inside of the smokebox. This was most likely to facilitate cleaning of the spark arrestor screens to overcome clogging without having to open the smokebox door. The cover handles were attached to the smokebox side by a small chain, as shown in the main picture. Judging from photographs, these covers were removed and the openings closed off in the SAR era.

Distribution
Four of the locomotives were numbered in the range from 537 to 540 for the Midland System of the CGR. The other ten were numbered 155, 160 and in the range from 287 to 294 for the Western System.

It would appear that the CGR's Western System was more concerned with having unbroken number ranges than the CGR itself was about allocating different classifications to dissimilar locomotives, even when they had different wheel arrangements. Of these Western System engine numbers, 155 and 160 had been used before on two 6th Class locomotives which had been sold to the Oranje-Vrijstaat Gouwerment-Spoorwegen (OVGS) in 1897.

Class 6 sub-classes
When the Union of South Africa was established on 31 May 1910, the three Colonial government railways (CGR, Natal Government Railways and Central South African Railways) were united under a single administration to control and administer the railways, ports and harbours of the Union. Although the South African Railways and Harbours came into existence in 1910, the actual classification and renumbering of all the rolling stock of the three constituent railways were only implemented with effect from 1 January 1912.

When these fourteen locomotives were assimilated into the SAR in 1912, they were renumbered in the range from 635 to 648 and designated .

The rest of the CGR's 6th Class locomotives, together with the Central South African Railways Classes 6-L1 to 6-L3 locomotives which had been inherited from the OVGS via the Imperial Military Railways (IMR), were grouped into thirteen more sub-classes by the SAR. The  locomotives became SAR Classes 6, 6A to 6H, 6K and 6L, the  locomotives were designated Class 6Y and the  locomotives were designated Class 6Z.

Service
The Class 6J has been described as the most successful of the bar-framed 6th Class locomotives. The CGR placed them in service on the Cape mainline and for several years they hauled the Dining Car Express Train which left Cape Town every Wednesday morning for the Orange River Colony and Johannesburg in Transvaal, running via De Aar, Noupoort and Springfontein.

The last Class 6J locomotive was withdrawn from service in Bethlehem in 1972.

Renumbering
The table lists the Class 6J works numbers and renumbering.

Preservation
Two members of the Class 6J survive.
 No. 641 is in storage at Epping Market Siding in Cape Town.
 No. 645 is on display at the Outeniqua Transport Museum in George.

Illustration
The main picture shows a Class 6J, with conductor Fred Hart, an unknown stoker, driver Jim-Boy Barlow and an unknown cleaner. The picture dates to c. 1912,  judging by the SAR-style cabside number plates, but still with a CGR-style cowcatcher.

The first picture below shows Western System 6th Class no. 292, later renumbered to SAR Class 6J no. 642, painted in the CGR's green livery on the Cape's Dining Car Express Train. It is a colourised photograph which was used as a post card, on which some artistic licence had been used with red wheels and a red headlight reflector. Also illustrated is a first class annual season ticket issued to Mr. W. Smith on 25 January 1909, which allowed the holder to travel between Cape Town and Hopefield, Eendekuil, Caledon, Franschhoek, Carnarvon, Prieska and Vryburg, literally all over the Western System lines in the present-day Western Cape and Northern Cape Provinces.

References

1400
1400
4-6-0 locomotives
2′C n2 locomotives
Neilson Reid locomotives
Cape gauge railway locomotives
Railway locomotives introduced in 1902
1902 in South Africa
Scrapped locomotives